Amber Gergaynia Beckett (née Shelley; born 25 November 1940) is a former Australian swimmer. She competed at the 1956 Summer Olympics and the 1960 Summer Olympics.

As a 15 year old, Beckett represented Australia at the 1956 Summer Olympics in the Women's 100 meters backstroke where she was placed second in the second heat clocking at time of 1:14.8. She was placed eighth in the finals clocking a time of 1:14.7. Beckett also participated in the 1960 Summer Olympics at Rome in the Women's 100 meters backstroke and Women's 4x100 meters medley relay. The Australian relay team came second in the race.

References

External links
 

1940 births
Living people
Australian female backstroke swimmers
Commonwealth Games medallists in swimming
Commonwealth Games silver medallists for Australia
Olympic swimmers of Australia
Swimmers at the 1956 Summer Olympics
Swimmers at the 1958 British Empire and Commonwealth Games
Swimmers at the 1960 Summer Olympics
Swimmers from Sydney
20th-century Australian women
Medallists at the 1958 British Empire and Commonwealth Games